Mong Monichariya is a Cambodian judge and member of the Khmer Rouge Tribunal. He has been a judge of the Supreme Court since 2002. He studied law in Kazakhstan, and received the degree of Master of Arts in Law from Kazakhstan National University in 1993.

References 

Living people
Year of birth missing (living people)
Cambodian judges
Khmer Rouge Tribunal judges
Place of birth missing (living people)